Clarence Norman Wharton (28 July 1903 in Askam-in-Furness, Lancashire,  England – July 1961) was an English footballer.

Career
He started his career with Askam, before joining Barrow in 1922. After making 44 league appearances for the club, he joined Preston North End in 1925. He made 13 league appearances for the club and rejoined Barrow in 1927. He moved to Sheffield United for a fee of £250 in 1928. He joined Norwich City in 1931 after making 70 league appearances for United. He won a Third Division South championship medal with them in the 1933–34 season. After making 101 league appearances for them, he joined Doncaster Rovers in May 1935. He joined York City in 1936 after making five league appearances for Rovers. He appeared in the club's 16 FA Cup ties played in the 1936–37 and 1937–38 seasons. He joined Leeds United in August 1939 after making 134 appearances for York. He made two league appearances for United.

Notes

1903 births
1961 deaths
People from Askam and Ireleth
English footballers
Association football goalkeepers
Barrow A.F.C. players
Preston North End F.C. players
Sheffield United F.C. players
Norwich City F.C. players
Doncaster Rovers F.C. players
York City F.C. players
Leeds United F.C. players
Footballers from Cumbria